Chah Qad is a village in Abdan Rural District, in the Abdan District of Deyr County, Bushehr Province, Iran. At the 2016 census, its population was 155, in 41 families.

References 

Populated places in Deyr County